Pua Mora Bhola Sankara is a 1996 Indian Odia-language film directed by Hara Patnaik starring Siddhanta Mahapatra, Rachna Banerjee and Mihir Das.  The film was a box office success and made Mihir Das popular.

Cast 
Siddhanta Mahapatra
Rachana Banerjee
Mihir Das
Priyanka Mohapatra
Hara Patnaik
Debu Bose
Jayiram Samal
Bina Moharana

Production 
The film is produced by Pradyumna Lenka. Rakhee Dash dubbed for Rachna Banerjee. Mihir Das was cast as an innocent servant. This is Priyanka Mohapatra's first film and she was cast opposite Das. The fight sequences were choreographed by Rama Murthy. Chandi Parija worked an assosiate director in this film. In an interview, Mihir Das called this film his best work.

Awards

References 

1990s Odia-language films